Vendresse-Beaulne is a commune in the Aisne department in Hauts-de-France in northern France.

It was established in 1923, combining the commune of Beaulne-et-Chivy with the neighboring commune of Vendresse-et-Troyon.

Population

See also
Communes of the Aisne department

References

Communes of Aisne
Aisne communes articles needing translation from French Wikipedia